The cherub in Eden is a figure mentioned in . Many translations, including the New International Version, identify the cherub with the King of Tyre, specifically Ithobaal III (reigned 591–573 BCE) who according to the list of kings of Tyre of Josephus was reigning contemporary with Ezekiel at the time of the first fall of Jerusalem. Other translations, including the New Revised Standard Version, see the cherub as the king's guardian.

Background 
Ezekiel has cited Eden in two extensive passages and one of these (28:11-19) portrayed the king of Tyre in terms of the cherub in Eden. The city is famed for the temple complex of Melkart with its renowned garden enclosure.

Tertullian
Tertullian in Against Marcion 2:10 linked the reference to the fall of Satan. This has been followed by many Christians since. Its theological interpretation is subject to much theorizing. One recognized that the prophet depicted such cherub within a primordial perfection, which was terminated by sin and consequent exile from the "mountain of God". A theory also posited that Eden was a simile for the portrayal of the splendor of a given geographical area, which in this case is Tyre and that its human king represented Satan, who was an angel in the garden in Genesis 3.

See also
Ezekiel 28

References

Angels in Christianity
Angels in Judaism
Book of Ezekiel
Satan
Garden of Eden